Handsworth may refer to:

 Handsworth, West Midlands, a suburb of Birmingham in the West Midlands, United Kingdom
Handsworth riots (disambiguation)
Handsworth Wood, an area adjacent to the above
Birmingham Handsworth (UK Parliament constituency) was centred on this area
 Handsworth, South Yorkshire, a suburb of Sheffield in Yorkshire, United Kingdom
 Handsworth, Saskatchewan, a hamlet in Saskatchewan, Canada
 Handsworth Secondary School, District of North Vancouver, British Columbia, Canada
 Handsworth F.C., an English football club based in Worksop